The 1995 Grand Prix de Tennis de Toulouse was a men's tennis tournament played on indoor hard courts in Toulouse, France that was part of the World Series of the 1995 ATP Tour. It was the fourteenth edition of the tournament and was held from 2 October until 8 October 1995. Fourth-seeded Arnaud Boetsch won the singles title.

Finals

Singles

 Arnaud Boetsch defeated  Jim Courier, 6–4, 6–7, 6–0

Doubles

 Jonas Björkman /  John-Laffnie de Jager defeated  Dave Randall /  Greg Van Emburgh, 7–6, 7–6

References

External links
 ITF tournament edition details

Grand Prix de Tennis de Toulouse
Grand Prix de Tennis de Toulouse
Toulouse
Grand Prix de Tennis de Toulouse